Transvision Vamp were an English pop rock band. Formed in 1986 by Nick Christian Sayer and Wendy James, the band enjoyed chart success in the late 1980s, particularly in 1989. James, the lead singer and focal-point of the group, attracted media attention with her sexually charged and rebellious image. They scored 10 UK chart hits and also enjoyed considerable success in Australia. Their top single was 1989's "Baby I Don't Care", which reached number three on the UK and Australian charts.

Career 

The band's original line-up was James, Sayer, Dave Parsons (bass), Tex Axile (keyboards) and Pol Burton (drums). Parsons and Axile had both been in punk bands prior to joining the band; Parsons in The Partisans, and Axile in various bands, most notably The Moors Murderers and X-Ray Spex offshoot Agent Orange.

The band were signed by MCA in December 1986 and released their first single, "Revolution Baby", the following year. It stalled at number 77 in the UK in September 1987. A cover of the Holly and the Italians' song, "Tell That Girl to Shut Up", was released as the band's second single in March 1988, reaching 45 on the UK Singles Chart. The single became their only charting entry on the US Billboard Hot 100, where it peaked at 87.

The band's third single, "I Want Your Love", with its pop/punk crossover appeal, became their first major hit, topping the Norwegian singles chart, and peaking within the top 10 in the UK, Ireland, Australia, New Zealand, Sweden, and Switzerland. Their next single was a re-release of "Revolution Baby", which rose to number 30 in the UK, 17 in Ireland, 24 in Australia and New Zealand. The fourth single, "Sister Moon", narrowly missed the UK top 40 at number 41.

In October 1988 the band released their debut album, Pop Art. It was a major success in the UK where it stayed on the album chart for 32 weeks, peaking at number 4. The album achieved a similar level of success in Australia, where it was certified platinum, and placed as the 25th highest-selling album of 1989. The album also did well in Switzerland (number 20) and Sweden (number 25).

1989 proved to be the band's most successful year, with the release of the single "Baby I Don't Care". The single peaked at number three in both the UK and Australia, making it the band's most successful single in both countries. In Australia, the song spent 20 weeks in the top 50. The band's second album, Velveteen, was released shortly after, debuting atop the UK Albums Chart and remaining on the chart for 26 weeks. Velveteen also reached number two on the Australian Albums Chart, spending 25 weeks in the top 100, and becoming the 39th best selling album of the year. Velveteen was also a significant success in New Zealand (reaching number 12), and parts of Europe, including Switzerland, Germany and Norway, where it entered the top twenty. The other singles from Velveteen: "The Only One", "Landslide of Love" and "Born to Be Sold" all peaked within the top 30 in the UK, and the top 20 in Ireland.

In June 1991, MCA refused to release Transvision Vamp's third album Little Magnets Versus the Bubble of Babble in the UK, reportedly disliking the direction of the music, and after the two singles didn't chart as highly as previous singles on the UK charts. The album was released in New Zealand where it was top twenty and reached number 14. In Australia, the album was released and it peaked at number 25, spending 3 months on the ARIA top 100 albums chart. It was also released in Sweden and reached number 27. The album's first single, "(I Just Wanna) B with U", peaked at number 16 in Australia, and charted at number 30 in the UK and entered the Irish top 30. The second single released from the album, "If Looks Could Kill", entered the top 40 in New Zealand, and just missed the UK top 40 at number 41, it became the band's final single release. A third single from the album, "Twangy Wigout" was planned and promo copies were issued but it was shelved by their label after disputes.

On the third album, Wendy James has stated "it came out in America. But then we decided to split up, during which time the English record label had said they weren't convinced about this record, we're going to hold off on it and see how well it does in other countries first. By the time they were ready to release it, we'd already decided to split up, and so it never came out."

The group officially disbanded in February 1992 following a statement from MCA. Wendy James launched her solo career in 1993 with the Elvis Costello-written album Now Ain't the Time for Your Tears.

Post-Vamp activities 
Anthony Doughty (Tex Axile) joined a band called Max with Matthew Ashman, Kevin Mooney, John Reynolds and John Keogh in which he played keyboards. They released a Trevor Horn-produced album Silence Running in 1992. Keogh died soon after the release and Ashman a couple of years later. Doughty continues to release solo albums on his own label.

Dave Parsons joined British post-grunge band Bush, who would achieve great commercial success in the 1990s.

Wendy James embarked on a solo career, with limited commercial success. Her 1993 album Now Ain't the Time for Your Tears, 'though written by Elvis Costello, it only reached number 43 on the UK Albums Chart. None of the three singles released from it entered the UK Top 30. The lead single, "The Nameless One", reached 34 on the UK Singles Chart, while the second single, "London's Brilliant", peaked at number 62. Third single, "Do You Know What I'm Saying?", peaked at number 78 in the UK. MCA and James parted company in August of that same year.

A follow-up solo album, recorded for One Little Indian, was not released. In 2004, James formed a band named Racine, with whom she has released two albums. Neither album charted anywhere. A single, "Grease Monkey", charted at number 114 in the UK in April 2005. Racine broke up and closed down their official band site in December 2008.

Band members 

 Wendy James: vocals (1986–1991)
 Nick Christian Sayer: guitar, backing vocals (1986–1991)
 Dave Parsons: bass, backing vocals (1986–1991)
 Tex Axile: keyboards, sequencer, drums, guitar, backing vocals (1986–1991)
 Pol Burton: drums (1986–1989)
 James "Jazz" Piper: guitar, backing vocals (1989–1991)
 Martin "Mallet" Hallett: drums, backing vocals (1989–1991)

Discography

Studio albums

Compilations 
 The Complete 12"ers Collection Vol. 1 (1990, MCA Records)
 Mixes (1992, MCA Records)
 Kiss Their Sons (1998, Universal Records)
 Baby I Don't Care (2002, Spectrum Music) – AUS No. 277
 I Want Your Love (6-CD/1-DVD boxed set) (2019, Edsel)

Singles

References

External links 
 We are Transvision Vamp!: Unofficial fan website
 Wendy James interview, Phase One, 1989

English pop punk groups
English alternative rock groups
English rock music groups
MCA Records artists
Musical groups established in 1986
Musical groups disestablished in 1991
Uni Records artists
1986 establishments in the United Kingdom